is a Japanese sacerdotal kin group which traces its roots from a Yayoi period shrine in the vicinity of northeastern Kyoto.  The clan rose to prominence during the Asuka and Heian periods when the Kamo are identified with the 7th-century founding of the Kamo Shrine.

Kamo Shrine
The Kamo Shrine's name references the area's early inhabitants, many of whom continue to live near the shrine their ancestors traditionally served.  The formal names of corollary jinja memorialize vital clan roots in a history which pre-dates the founding of Japan's ancient capital.

The jinja names identify the various kami or deities who are venerated; and the name also refers to the ambit of shrine's nearby woods.

Although now incorporated within boundaries of the city, the location was once Tadasu no Mori (糺の森), the wild forest home of the exclusive caretakers of the shrine from prehistoric times.

Notable clan members

 Kamo no Chōmei (1155–1216)
 Kamo no Mabuchi (1697–1769)

Although Ieyasu Tokugawa never used the surname Tokugawa before 1566, his appointment as shōgun was contingent on his claim to Matsudaira kinship and a link to the Seiwa Genji. Modern scholarship has revealed that the genealogy proffered to the emperor contained falsified information; however, since the Matsudaira used the same crest as the Kamo clan, some academics suggest that he was likely a descendant of the Kamo clan."<ref>Plutschow, Herbert. (1995).  "Japan's Name Culture: The Significance of Names in a Religious, Political and Social Context, p. 158.]</ref>

Notes

References
 Breen, John and Mark Teeuwen. (2000).  Shinto in History: Ways of the Kami. Honolulu: University of Hawaii Press. 
 Iwao, Seiichi, Teizō Iyanaga, Susumu Ishii, Shōichirō Yoshida, et al.'' (2002). [https://books.google.com/books?id=fW9v37poqcQC  Dictionnaire historique du Japon. Paris: Maisonneuve & Larose. ; OCLC 51096469
 Nelson, John K. (2000).  Enduring Identities: The Guise of Shinto in Contemporary Japan. Honolulu: University of Hawaii Press. 
 Nussbaum, Louis-Frédéric and Käthe Roth. (2002).  Japan Encyclopedia. Cambridge: Harvard University Press.   (cloth) --  (paper)
 Plutschow, Herbert. (1995).  "Japan's Name Culture: The Significance of Names in a Religious, Political and Social Context.'' London: Routledge.  (cloth)
 Terry, Thomas Philip. (1914).  Terry's Japanese empire: including Korea and Formosa, with chapters on Manchuria, the Trans-Siberian railway, and the chief ocean routes to Japan; a guidebook for travelers. New York: Houghton Mifflin. 

Japanese clans
Meiji Restoration